Loukoléla is a town in the Cuvette Department in eastern Republic of the Congo.

References

Cuvette Department
Populated places in the Republic of the Congo